On 10 June 2022, Finance Minister Miftah Ismail presented a federal budget of Rs 9.5 trillion for the financial year 2022-2023, which is nearly a trillion higher than the previous financial year. On 29 June 2022, the National Assembly of Pakistan approved the passage of the Finance Bill, 2022.

On February 2023, Pakistani cabinet approves ‘Finance Supplementary Bill 2023’ for Mini Budget.

See also
 2022 Pakistan economic crisis

References

Budgets
Pakistani budgets
Parliament of Pakistan
2022 in Pakistani politics
2023 in Pakistani politics
June 2022 events in Pakistan